Island Harbour is a constituency of the Anguillan House of Assembly. The incumbent is Premier-elect Ellis Lorenzo Webster.

Representatives
Island Harbour has been a relatively safe seat for the ANA/AUF since inception - the party has held it since 1989.

Election results

Elections in the 2020s 

|- class="vcard" 
  | style="background-color:"|
  | class="org" style="width: 130px" | AUF
  | class="fn" |Oris Smith
  | style="text-align:right;" | 336
  | style="text-align:right;" | 33.7
  | style="text-align:right;" | +0.5

Elections in the 2010s

Elections in the 2000s

Elections in the 1990s

Elections in the 1980s

External links
Constituency results on the government's website. 

Constituencies of the Anguillan House of Assembly